Owura Nsiah Edwards (born 10 April 2001) is an English footballer who plays as a winger for Scottish Premiership side Ross County, on loan from  club Bristol City.

Edwards started his career at Newport County and had a loan spell at Mangotsfield United prior to joining Bristol City in summer 2019. Following loan spells at Bath City and Grimsby Town, he made his first-team debut for Bristol City in January 2021. He joined Exeter City on loan for the 2021–22 season, but was recalled in January and spent the second half of the season on loan at Colchester United. In June 2022 he was signed on loan to Dingwall-based Ross County.

Career

Early career
Edwards started his career at Newport County, and joined Mangotsfield United on a work experience loan in February 2019. In summer 2019, Edwards joined Bristol City after they agreed a compensation fee with his previous youth team Newport County, and joined Bath City on a season-long loan. Edwards made his debut for Bath City on 3 September 2019 in a 3–0 victory over Hampton & Richmond Borough. He made 3 appearances across the 2019–20 season for Bath City.

Bristol City
On 5 September 2020, Edwards signed for League Two side Grimsby Town on a season-long loan deal. He made his professional debut for Grimsby Town the same day as a substitute in a 1–1 EFL Cup defeat to Morecambe, in which Grimsby lost 4–3 on penalties. He scored his first goal for the club on 13 October 2020 in a 3–0 League Two victory over Cheltenham Town. On 31 December 2020, following the departure of manager Ian Holloway, Edwards and fellow Bristol City team mate James Morton were recalled from their loan spells at Grimsby. Edwards made 11 starts during his time at Blundell Park, scoring 1 goal. Edwards made his debut for Bristol City on 23 January 2021 as an 80th-minute substitute for Zak Vyner in a 3–0 FA Cup win over Millwall. He made his Championship debut in a 1–0 defeat to Derby County a week later and two further Championship appearances before the end of the 2020–21 season. In May 2021, he signed a two-year contract with the option of a further year.

On 20 August 2021, Edwards joined League Two side Exeter City on loan for the duration of the 2021–22 season. He made his debut for the club on 21 August 2021 in a 4–1 win over Bristol Rovers. After 10 league appearances, Edwards' was recalled from his loan spell with the Grecians on 14 January 2022, and three days later, he moved on loan to their divisional rivals Colchester United. He scored on his debut for Colchester in the third minute of a 3–2 defeat to Sutton United with a "right-foot shot from 25 yards". He made 12 appearances and scored three goals before suffering a knee injury in a 1–0 defeat to Bristol Rovers on 15 March, which saw him return to his parent club for treatment. He made 1 further appearance as a substitute in a 3–0 win over Bradford City.

On 26 June 2022, he joined Scottish Premiership side Ross County on loan for the 2022–23 season.

Personal life
Born in England, Edwards is of Ghanaian descent. He is the younger brother of fellow footballer Opi Edwards.

Career statistics

References

External links
 
 

2001 births
Living people
English footballers
English sportspeople of Ghanaian descent
Association football wingers
Newport County A.F.C. players
Mangotsfield United F.C. players
Bristol City F.C. players
Bath City F.C. players
Grimsby Town F.C. players
Exeter City F.C. players
Colchester United F.C. players
Ross County F.C.  players
Southern Football League players
National League (English football) players
English Football League players
Scottish Professional Football League players